The original R-D1, announced by Epson in March 2004 and discontinued in 2007, was the first digital rangefinder camera. Subsequently, three modifications of the original R-D1 were produced - R-D1s, R-D1x, and R-D1xG.

R-D1 
R-D1 was jointly developed by Seiko Epson and Cosina and manufactured by the latter, which also builds the current Voigtländer cameras. It uses Leica M-mount lenses or earlier Leica screw mount lenses with an adapter.

An unusual feature to note on the R-D1 is that it is a digital camera that has a manually wound shutter with a rapid wind lever. The controls operate in the same way as film-based rangefinder cameras.

Data such as white balance, shutter speed, picture quality, and shots remaining are all displayed with servo driven indicators on a dial like a watch face (made by Epson's parent company Seiko).  With the rear screen folded away, it is not obviously a digital camera.

R-D1 and all of the subsequent modifications of the camera have been using the same 1.5x crop factor sensor, interline-transfer CCD (Sony ICX413AQ). The same sensor as used in Pentax *ist D, Nikon D100. Sensor originally dates to 2002.

R-D1s 
The successor of R-D1, the R-D1s was released in March 2006. The Epson R-D1s is mechanically identical to the R-D1, but with a firmware upgrade. It adds:
 JPEG+RAW mode
 Quick view function
 Adobe RGB mode
 Noise reduction for long exposures

Users of R-D1 could upgrade their camera to have the same functions.

R-D1x 
The successors of the R-D1s, the R-D1x and R-D1xG were made available from 9 April 2009 in Japan only. They feature very similar feature set except for few modifications:
 Larger 2.5" LCD display (vs 2" in the previous model) but with the same resolution - 235K
 LCD is no longer articulated and cannot be closed
 Support of SDHC memory cards which increased max. capacity to 32 GB (vs. 2 GB for previous models)
 Improvements in accessibility of rangefinder adjustment
 R-D1xG model also includes removable grip

On 17 March 2014, Epson announced that the R-D1x is discontinued.

References

External links 

 Epson R-D1: A field test, The Luminous Landscape
  covering history, owner issues, FAQ, accessories, and Rich Cutler's information
 R-D1 specific forum on Rangefinderforum.com

Digital rangefinder cameras
R-D1